Parnell Place Bus Station is the principal bus station in Cork, Ireland, for Expressway and Regional services operated by Bus Éireann, InterCity services operated by GoBé, and international services operated by Eurolines.

Historically, all regional bus services to or from Cork City used Parnell Place bus station, but in recent years a number of services to nearby towns such as Ballincollig, Crosshaven, Carrigaline and Passage West have started using on street bus stops due to capacity constraints.

Services

International
As of July 2021

National
As of July 2021,

Regional
As of July 2021

City
As of July 2021, only the 215 city service includes a stop directly at Parnell Place Bus Station. However, several services stop at Merchant's Quay, less than 100m away – these include the 202, 203, 207A, 209, and 209A. The 205 service to University College Cork and Cork Institute of Technology has its terminus at Cork Kent railway station (750m walk), and multiple services stop on nearby St Patrick's Street.

References

External links
 Bus Éireann homepage
 GoBé homepage
 Eurolines homepage

Bus stations in Ireland